Zlatan Arnautović (born 2 September 1956) is a Serbian former handball coach and player who competed for Yugoslavia in the 1980 Summer Olympics and in the 1984 Summer Olympics.

Club career
Born in Prijedor, Arnautović started playing handball at his hometown club Bosnamontaža. He later played for Borac Banja Luka, Barcelona, and Lagisa Naranco.

International career
At international level, Arnautović competed for Yugoslavia in two Olympic Games, winning the gold medal at the 1984 Summer Olympics. He was also a regular member of the team that won the 1986 World Championship.

Coaching career
During the 1990s, Arnautović served as head coach of both Crvena zvezda and Partizan.

Honours

Player
Borac Banja Luka
 Yugoslav Handball Championship: 1980–81
 Yugoslav Handball Cup: 1978–79
 EHF Cup: 1990–91

Coach
Crvena zvezda
 Handball Championship of FR Yugoslavia: 1997–98

References

External links
 Olympic record
 

1956 births
Living people
People from Prijedor
Serbian male handball players
Yugoslav male handball players
Olympic handball players of Yugoslavia
Olympic gold medalists for Yugoslavia
Handball players at the 1980 Summer Olympics
Handball players at the 1984 Summer Olympics
Olympic medalists in handball
Medalists at the 1984 Summer Olympics
Competitors at the 1983 Mediterranean Games
Mediterranean Games gold medalists for Yugoslavia
Mediterranean Games medalists in handball
RK Prijedor players
RK Borac Banja Luka players
FC Barcelona Handbol players
Liga ASOBAL players
Expatriate handball players
Yugoslav expatriate sportspeople in Spain
Serbian handball coaches